The Forbes Global 2000 is an annual ranking of the top 2000 public companies in the world, published by Forbes magazine. "The Global 2000" annual ranking is assembled by Forbes using a weighted assessment of four metrics: sales, profit, assets and market value. The list has been published since 2003.

By country 

Forbes 2000 as of 2022:

2022 list 
In 2022, the ten largest companies as calculated by this method were:

2021 list 
In 2021, the ten largest companies as calculated by this method were:

2020 list 
In 2020, the ten largest companies as calculated by this method were:

2019 list 
In 2019, the ten largest companies as calculated by this method were:

2018 list 
In 2018, the ten largest companies as calculated by this method were:

As a group, the Forbes Global 2000 in year 2018 accounts for $39.1* trillion in sales, $3.2 trillion in profit, $189* trillion in assets and $56.8* trillion in market value.

By industry sector 
The top-ranked companies in each industry sector are as follows.

2017 list 
In 2017, the ten largest companies as calculated by this method were:

2016 list 
In 2016, the ten largest companies as calculated by this method were:

See also 

 Forbes 500
 Fortune Global 500
 Fortune India 500
 Financial Times Global 500
 Bentley Infrastructure 500
 List of largest employers
 List of largest companies by revenue
 List of public corporations by market capitalization
 List of largest Nordic companies

References

External links 
 Forbes.com: full list of the Forbes Global 2000

Global 2000
21st century-related lists
Lists of companies by revenue
Corporation-related lists
International rankings
Top lists
Annual magazine issues
Publicly traded companies